The 1950 International Cross Country Championships was held in Brussels, Belgium, at the Hippodrome de Boitsfort on March 25, 1950.   A report on the event was given in the Glasgow Herald.

Complete results, medallists, 
 and the results of British athletes were published.

Medallists

Individual Race Results

Men's (9 mi / 14.5 km)

Team Results

Men's

Participation
An unofficial count yields the participation of 88 athletes from 10 countries.

 (9)
 (9)
 (9)
 (9)
 (8)
 (9)
 (9)
 (8)
 (9)
 (9)

See also
 1950 in athletics (track and field)

References

International Cross Country Championships
International Cross Country Championships
Cross
International Cross Country Championships
Sports competitions in Brussels
International Cross Country Championships, 1950
Cross country running in Belgium
International Cross Country Championships